AlphaTauri or variant, may refer to:

Aldebaran, also known as Alpha Tauri (α Tau)
AlphaTauri (fashion brand), fashion brand
Scuderia AlphaTauri, Formula One team since 2020; formerly Scuderia Toro Rosso

See also

 
 
 
 
 A Tauri
 Alpha (disambiguation)
 Tauri (disambiguation)